Flann Ua Aedha (died 1110) was Abbot of Aran.

Biography

Flann Ua Aedha is one of the few named successors to Enda of Aran. He died during the fourth year of the reign of King Tairrdelbach Ua Conchobair of Connacht, and was succeeded by Maelcoluim Ua Cormacain.

Since the 18th and 19th century, the surname has been rendered as Ó hAodha, O'Hughes or Hughes, but is not to be confused with a similar Galway surname, Mac Aedha/MacHugh.

See also

 Séamas Ó hAodha

External links
 https://celt.ucc.ie/published/T100005A/text055.html
 https://www.johngrenham.com/findasurname.php?surname=Hughes 

12th-century deaths
Christian clergy from County Galway
Medieval Gaels from Ireland
12th-century Irish abbots
Year of birth unknown